Holiday for Strings is an album by Paul Motian and the Electric Bebop Band released on the German Winter & Winter label in 2002. The album is the group's sixth release. Like their previous album, the band consists of saxophonists Chris Cheek and Pietro Tonolo, guitarists Ben Monder and Steve Cardenas, and bass guitarist Anders Christensen.

Reception
The Allmusic review by Glenn Astarita awarded the album 4 stars, stating, "the sextet provides its indelible touch of class to a series of generally moving works -- regardless of intensity... Passionately recommended".

Track listing
All compositions by Paul Motian except as indicated
 "Arabesque" - 3:35 
 "5 Miles to Wrentham" - 4:06 
 "Morpion" - 5:05 
 "Luteous Pangolin" (Ben Monder) - 4:31 
 "Look to the Black Wall" - 3:36 
 "Holiday for Strings" (David Rose, Sam Gallop) - 5:31 
 "Endgame" - 3:44 
 "It Never Entered My Mind" (Lorenz Hart, Richard Rodgers) - 6:15 
 "Roundup" (Steve Cardenas) - 3:30 
 "Oh, What a Beautiful Mornin'" (Oscar Hammerstein II, Richard Rodgers) - 3:04

Personnel
Paul Motian - drums
Pietro Tonolo - alto saxophone
Chris Cheek - tenor saxophone
Steve Cardenas - electric guitar
Ben Monder - electric guitar
Anders Christensen - electric bass

References 

2002 albums
Paul Motian albums
Winter & Winter Records albums